The 1956 Baltimore Colts season was the fourth season for the team in the National Football League. Under third-year head coach Weeb Ewbank, the Colts posted a record of 5 wins and 7 losses, fourth in the Western Conference.

Regular season

Schedule

Standings

See also 
History of the Indianapolis Colts
Indianapolis Colts seasons
Colts–Patriots rivalry

References

Baltimore Colts
1956
Baltimore Colt